Joseph Walker Barr (January 17, 1918 – February 23, 1996) was an American businessman and politician from Indiana. He served one term in the United States House of Representatives. He was also the United States Secretary of the Treasury from December 21, 1968 until January 20, 1969, in President Lyndon B. Johnson's cabinet. He was a member of the Democratic Party.

Early life and career 
Barr was born in Vincennes, Indiana, on January 17, 1918, the son of Oscar Lynn Barr and Stella Florence Walker.  He graduated from DePauw University, and married the former Beth Ann Williston in Indianapolis on September 3, 1939; they had five children: Bonnie Barr Gilliom, Cherry Ann Barr, Joseph Williston Barr, Elizabeth Eugenia Barr LoSasso and Lynn Hamilton Barr Fineberg.  He was a member of the Phi Kappa Psi fraternity and earned a master's degree in economics from Harvard University in Cambridge, Massachusetts, in 1941.

He served in the United States Navy from 1942 to 1945, during World War II, with subchaser duty in the Mediterranean Sea and Atlantic Ocean. He received a Bronze Star for sinking a submarine off Anzio Beach.

After Barr returned from the war, he engaged in the operation of grain elevators, theaters, real estate and publishing businesses.

Political career 
In 1958, he defeated Charles B. Brownson for a seat in Congress from Indiana's 11th congressional district, a Republican stronghold.  He was aided by Democratic gains that increased the party's majority from 35 to 129 seats. During his time in the House, he became friends with then-Senator John F. Kennedy. He served only one term before being defeated for re-election in 1960.

After his electoral defeat, President Kennedy appointed him as the Assistant to the Secretary of the Treasury for Congressional Relations.  In 1963, he was appointed Chairman of the Federal Deposit Insurance Corporation. Barr served as the Undersecretary of the Treasury from 1965 to 1968, during the administration of President Lyndon B. Johnson. When Henry H. Fowler resigned in December 1968, Johnson named Barr as the Secretary of the Treasury with a recess appointment, effective for the remainder of Johnson's term in office. His 28 days in the position was the shortest term of any Treasury Secretary. Given his short period in office, his signature appears only on the one-dollar bill.

Later years 
After leaving office, he was named as the vice chairman of American Security and Trust Company.  He then served as the president and the chairman from 1969 to 1974 and the chairman of Federal Home Loan Bank in Atlanta, Georgia from 1977 to 1981.

Barr died of a heart attack in Playa del Carmen, Mexico, and was interred in Leeds Episcopal Church Cemetery in Hume, Virginia.

References

External links

US Treasury - Biography of Secretary Joseph W. Barr
US Bureau of Engraving and Printing - Barr Notes
December 16, 1981 speech at DePauw University
1959 TV News segment

1918 births
1996 deaths
20th-century American politicians
United States Navy personnel of World War II
DePauw University alumni
Harvard Graduate School of Arts and Sciences alumni
People from Knox County, Indiana
United States Secretaries of the Treasury
Lyndon B. Johnson administration cabinet members
Democratic Party members of the United States House of Representatives from Indiana
Chairs of the Federal Deposit Insurance Corporation